University School of Law & Legal Studies is one of the constituent schools of Guru Gobind Singh Indraprastha University. Established in 2001, it is an institution dedicated to law and was the first state government law school in Delhi. It is constantly rated in the top 15 government law schools in India offering a 5 year course. It is also rated in the top 5 law schools in Delhi NCR. The acceptance rate of USLLS is incredibly low, given the less number of seats and large number of applicants. USLLS was also ranked 1 in the National Institutional Ranking Framework, Ministry of Education, Government of India (law category).

History
Established in 2001 by AKASH DALLA the objective of University School of Law and Legal Studies was to run a Five Year Integrated Professional Law Course and to serve as an institution of advanced legal studies. It was the first University Law School established in the vicinity of the Supreme Court, Delhi High Court, various subordinate courts, commissions, tribunals and various monitoring offices of national and international voluntary organizations.

Earlier located at Kashmere Gate, the college shifted to new 65 acre Dwarka campus and now has state of the art infrastructure shared by other colleges inside the main campus of the University.

Programmes Offered
School offers the following programmes, in the field of Law and Legal Studies:
 B.A., LL.B. (H) Five Year Course

Duration: 05 years (Ten Semesters - Regular teaching in nine semesters and Dissertation in the tenth semester) 
 B.B.A., LL.B. (H) Five Year Course

Duration: 05 years (Ten Semesters - Regular teaching in nine semesters and Dissertation in the tenth semester) 
 Master of Laws (LL.M.) Regular Course

Duration: 02 years (Four Semesters - Regular teaching in three semesters and Dissertation in the fourth semester)

The college offers the LL.M. programme for the following fields of specialization: 
 Corporate Law
 Human Rights Law
 Intellectual Property Rights
 International Trade Law
 Alternative Dispute Redressal (ADR)

Foreign Students: Some percentage of seats are reserved for foreign students in the University School in both graduate and post graduate programmes.
 Master of Laws (LL.M.) Weekend Course

Duration: 02 years (Four Semesters - Regular teaching in three semesters and Dissertation in the fourth semester) 
Intake: 20 + 20 seats
Selection Pattern: Admission through Interview.

The LL.M. programme in the following fields of specialization:

Industrial and Intellectual Property Law

Cyber Law and Cyber Crimes
 Ph.D. 
The school offers Ph.D. programme in various disciplines of law.

The law school offered modular LL.B(Hons.) from 2001 to 2004 Batches. From 2005 to 2013 Batches its offered B.A.,LL.B (Hons.). 
From 2014 onwards, the law school offers B.A. LL.B (Integrated).

Seat Matrix
 B.A. LLB (5 Year Integrated) : Total seats are 61 = 26 (General-Delhi) + 05 (only for General category Outside Delhi) + 27 (Reserved Seats)
 BBA LLB (5 Year Integrated) Total seats are 40 = 20 (General-Delhi + 3 (General - Outside Delhi) + 17 (Reserved Seats)

Reserved Categories are SC, ST, OBC, DEF, PH, KM

Admission
Admissions for the five year integrated LL.B.(H) course are made on the basis of merit, which is evaluated by the 'Common Entrance Test of Guru Gobind Singh Indraprastha University - commonly knows as the CET'. USLLS has a small batch of not more than 60 students, most of whom procure an all India rank of under 60 in CET.

As of 2019 and onwards, The admission to USLLS will based on Common Law Admission Test marks rather than CET. (which will no longer be conducted).

Alumni Association of University School of Law and Legal Studies

The law school has an alumni association having a network of more than 1200 alumni across the world.

See also
Guru Gobind Singh Indraprastha University
Education in Delhi

References

External links
http://www.ipu.ac.in/uslls/

Constituent schools of Guru Gobind Singh Indraprastha University
Educational institutions established in 2001
Law schools in Delhi
2001 establishments in Delhi